Rodrigo Moreira may refer to:

 Rodrigo Moreira (director) (born 1983), Ecuadorian model and beauty pageant winner
 Rodrigo Moreira (footballer, born 1996), Argentine footballer
 Rodrigo Moreira (footballer, born 2001), Uruguayan footballer